Lajos Varga (23 November 1933 – 7 February 2006) was a Hungarian gymnast. He competed at the 1960 Summer Olympics and the 1964 Summer Olympics.

References

External links
 

1933 births
2006 deaths
Hungarian male artistic gymnasts
Olympic gymnasts of Hungary
Gymnasts at the 1960 Summer Olympics
Gymnasts at the 1964 Summer Olympics
Sportspeople from Békés County